Gustav Jahn (17 May 1879, Vienna -  17 August 1919, on the , Ennstal Alps) was a landscape painter, poster artist and mountaineer who lived most of his life in the Austro-Hungarian Empire.

Early life and education

Gustav Jahn was born in 1879 in Vienna. 
His true passion was mountaineering; an interest which dated from a very early age. 
Starting in 1895, he attended the private art school operated by Adolf Kaufmann, and in 1896 at age 16 was admitted at the Academy of Fine Arts, Vienna. There, he studied with August Eisenmenger and Alois Delug and in 1899 was awarded the Gundel-Prize for excellence. 

From 1900 to 1904, he again had private lessons; this time with the genre painter, Franz Rumpler. From 1901 onward, he was member of the prestigious Austrian Alpine Club. He eventually combined his interests; specializing in landscapes and genre scenes of the high mountains. As part of the Rome Prize he won a Kenyon study scholarship in 1904 which he used more for climbing in the Mont Blanc area than painting.

Career
Within ten weeks Jahn painted twelve large-format paintings depicting Austrian life and scenery with people in traditional costumes, which won awards at the  World Fair of Saint Louis in 1904. The cycle is lost except for one copy. 
Starting in 1898 as a student, he furnished the illustrations for the catalogs of "Bergsporthaus", a store selling mountaineering equipment owned by ski racer , which was the first of its kind in Vienna. Jahn was close friends with the painter Otto Barth (artist), who also was an enthusiastic mountaineer.

In 1907, the 28-year-old painter and graphic artist was so well known, that he was awarded a major contract to advertise newly completed Alpine railway lines for the Imperial Royal Austrian State Railways. Jahn presented these in Art Nouveau style, as was typical in Austria for public contracts. While his sheets still had the effect of paintings and were not really flat and "poster like", their design was intended for indoor advertising at stations, for which the decorative character was in the foreground. 16 of the series have been preserved.

His favorite mountaineering areas were the Rax and Schneeberg, Gesäuse, Dachstein and the Dolomites. He participated in the first ascent of the Große Bischofsmütze. 

Jahn was a committed skier and ski jumper winning over twenty-eight awards during the course of his career. These achievements led to his serving as an instruction officer during World War I teaching mountain warfare in the Dolomites, a time during which he also painted on the side. 

In August 1919, he and his climbing partner, Michael Kofler rode the train to Gstatterboden for a climbing tour. After successfully climbing the Hochtor north face, the two wanted to climb the northwest ridge of the Ödstein, but suffered a fatal fall of 400 meters. The cause of their fall remains unclear. It probably occurred at a key point of the wall, the Preuss crossing, which is difficult to secure (climbing grade IV-V).   
He was buried at the Bergsteigerfriedhof in Johnsbach.

Legacy
Jahn inspired younger painters to paint like him, for example Stoibner or Emmerich Schaffran. He popularized mountaineering at a time when wider society made fun of rock climbing.

A climbing route on the North face of the Hochtor is named after him (Jahnweg), as well as on the south face of the Große Bischofsmütze.

References

Further reading 
 Hanns Barth: . In: Heinrich Heß (Ed.): Mitteilungen des Deutschen und Österreichischen Alpenvereins. Neue Folge Vol.XXXV, 1919, S. 110 f. (Online bei ALO).

External links 

1879 births
1919 deaths
Poster artists from the Austro-Hungarian Empire
Landscape painters from the Austro-Hungarian Empire
Mountain climbers from the Austro-Hungarian Empire
Male cross-country skiers from the Austro-Hungarian Empire
Artists from Vienna
Deaths from falls